The 1953 Australian Grand Prix was a Formula Libre motor race held at Albert Park Street Circuit, Victoria on 21 November 1953.  The race, which had 40 starters, was held over 64 laps of the five kilometre circuit for a total of 322 kilometres. It was organised by the Light Car Club of Australia and Army Southern Command.

It was the eighteenth Australian Grand Prix. While much of the Grand Prix's history to this point had taken place on public road or street circuits, this was the first time it had been held on a circuit in a major population centre. The circuit was laid out on public roads surrounding the Albert Park Lake in inner Melbourne.

The race was won by Doug Whiteford, his third and final Australian Grand Prix victory, equalling the feat achieved by Bill Thompson in the 1930s. It was also the largest margin of victory in the race's history, Whiteford winning by six laps for a margin of 30 kilometres.

Classification 
Results as follows.

Notes
 Winner's average speed: 82.85 mph
Fastest lap: Stan  Jones – 2'03

References

Grand Prix
Australian Grand Prix
Motorsport at Albert Park
Australian Grand Prix